KHGA may refer to:

 KHGA (FM), a radio station (103.9 FM) licensed to serve Earle, Arkansas, United States
 4-hydroxy-2-oxoglutarate aldolase